WJWC-LP (101.9 FM) was a radio station formerly licensed to serve Gallion, Alabama. The station was owned by the Gallion Urban Broadcast Association. It aired an Urban Oldies music format.

History
This station received its original construction permit from the Federal Communications Commission on April 24, 2003. The new station was assigned the call letters WJWC-LP by the FCC on October 9, 2003. WJWC-LP received its license to cover from the FCC on March 3, 2005. On November 17, 2011, the station's license was cancelled and its call sign deleted from the FCC's database per the licensee's request.

References

External links

JWC-LP
JWC-LP
Urban oldies radio stations in the United States
Radio stations established in 2003
Hale County, Alabama
Radio stations disestablished in 2011
Defunct radio stations in the United States
2003 establishments in Alabama
2011 disestablishments in Alabama
JWC-LP